Kayoceras is a genus of middle Silurian nautiloid cephalopods, known from Iowa and Illinois, belonging to the Discosoridae. Related genera include Discosorus, Endodiscosorus, and Stokesoceras. Kayoceras has a short, breviconic shell, like Discosorus, but with a more central siphuncle. Derivation is probably from Discosorus, through an evolutionary shifting of the siphuncle position, which has its origin in the Lowoceratidae, possibly through Tuyloceras.

References

 Curt Teichert, 1964. Nautiloidea -Discosorida; Treatise on Invertebrate Paleontology, Part K. Geological Society of America and University of Kansas Press.  
 Kayoceras , Paleobiology database.

Prehistoric nautiloid genera
Discosorida